Claudio Alejandro Reyna (born July 20, 1973) is an American former professional soccer player and former executive. He most recently served as sporting director of Austin FC.

A former midfielder, he spent most of his professional career in Europe, playing in the Bundesliga for Bayer Leverkusen and VfL Wolfsburg, the Premier League for Sunderland and Manchester City, and in the Scottish Premier League for Rangers. He finished his career in 2008 for New York Red Bulls of Major League Soccer, where he was team captain.

Reyna earned 112 caps for the United States men's national team from 1994 to 2006, being selected for four FIFA World Cups and retiring from the team after the 2006 edition. He was also chosen for two Olympic tournaments, four CONCACAF Gold Cups and the 1995 Copa América. He was named in the Team of the Tournament for the 2002 FIFA World Cup, and elected to the National Soccer Hall of Fame in 2012.

Following retirement, Reyna continued his association with the City Football Group and became technical director of New York City FC in 2013, a position he held until 2019 before joining Austin FC in a similar position.

Early life
Reyna's father Miguel moved to the United States in 1968 from Argentina, where he had gone through the youth system of Independiente and played professionally with Los Andes. He settled in Springfield Township, New Jersey in the 1970s. Reyna was born in Livingston, New Jersey, where he learned the game from his father.

Club career

Early career
In New Jersey, Reyna became a youth player at Jonathan Dayton High School and then transferred to Saint Benedict's Preparatory School, where he was a teammate of Gregg Berhalter and Robert Ducey, before he graduated from St. Benedict's in 1991. During Reyna's three years with the team, St Benedict's went undefeated (65–0) while Reyna was named as the only two-time Parade Magazine's national high school Player of the Year and the Gatorade National Player of the Year. In 1999, he was named by The Star-Ledger as one of the top ten New Jersey high school soccer players of the 1990s.

Highly recruited out of high school, Reyna elected to attend the University of Virginia from 1991 to 1993 on a full scholarship. While at Virginia, he spent three seasons on the men's soccer team, coached by future U.S. national team coach Bruce Arena. The Cavaliers won the NCAA Championship each of his three seasons. On an individual level, Reyna won the Hermann Trophy in 1993 and the MAC Award in 1992 and 1993; and was named the 1992 and 1993 Soccer America Player of the Year. In 2000, the magazine placed him on its Team of the Century and named him the Male Player of the Century.

Bayer Leverkusen and VfL Wolfsburg
On August 8, 1994, Reyna signed with German Bundesliga club Bayer 04 Leverkusen after playing in the 1994 FIFA World Cup. He had difficulty finding playing time with the Leverkusen first team, making only five appearances. Leverkusen loaned Reyna to fellow Bundesliga side VfL Wolfsburg in July 1997. He quickly established himself in Wolfsburg's first team where he became the first American to captain a European club.

He was halfway through his second year with Wolfsburg when Scottish Premier League club Rangers expressed an interest in Reyna.

Rangers
On April 1, 1999, Rangers paid $826,400 to Wolfsburg and $2.76 million to Leverkusen for Reyna. Reyna would remain with Rangers until December 2001. Despite building his reputation in Germany and on the national team as a creative midfielder, he spent most of his years at Rangers playing right midfield. He scored thirteen goals for the Ibrox club in all competitions, one of the most notable was a strike that proved decisive over Italian club Parma for qualification for the 1999–2000 UEFA Champions League. He played for Rangers during the September 11 attacks; a Celtic fan at an Old Firm match in October 2001 was caught on camera making aeroplane gestures, for which the fan was much criticised, later apologising.

Sunderland
On December 7, 2001, Reyna signed a five-year contract at Sunderland in England's Premier League, for a fee of £4 million. He completed the deal minutes before the midday deadline, having played for Rangers in the UEFA Cup at Paris Saint-Germain the night before.

Reyna made his debut on December 15, starting in a 2–0 loss at Southampton in place of the injured Julio Arca, and had a 20-yard first-half shot saved by Paul Jones. A week later, he scored the only goal of the game against Everton, in his first game at the Stadium of Light. On April 1, 2002, he scored twice in a 2–1 home win over Leicester City in which all goals were scored in the first 18 minutes; twelve days later he was sent off at the end of a loss to visitors Liverpool for a foul on goalscorer Michael Owen.

In October 2002, Reyna injured the anterior cruciate ligament in his knee against Bolton Wanderers, ruling him out for six months and ending his season.

Manchester City
Reyna joined Manchester City on August 29, 2003, for £2.5 million after a move on the same fee to Fulham collapsed.

Reyna's time at City was frequently punctuated by injury, restricting him to thirty appearances in his first season with the club, and causing him to miss six months of the 2004–05 season. In three and a half seasons at the City of Manchester Stadium, Reyna made 87 appearances, scoring four goals.

On January 11, 2007, Manchester City manager Stuart Pearce announced that the club had agreed to terminate Reyna's contract with a view to a move to Major League Soccer for family reasons.  This was finalized on January 23, 2007.

New York Red Bulls
On January 24, 2007, Reyna signed with New York Red Bulls, where he rejoined his former University of Virginia and U.S. national team head coach Bruce Arena. However, much like his years in Britain, Reyna was almost constantly bothered by injuries. He only played in twenty-seven games during two years with New York and only six games in 2008 as he rehabilitated a herniated disc. Reyna announced his professional retirement on July 16, 2008.

International career

As a U.S. national player, Reyna got his first cap against Norway on January 15, 1994. He was a member of the team at the 1994 FIFA World Cup on home turf, but did not play due to injury. Reyna did play in the 1998, 2002 and 2006 FIFA World Cups.

In 2002, despite sitting out the opening 3–2 upset win over Portugal due to injury, he was a key contributor in the next three U.S. games — a tie against South Korea, a loss to Poland, and a win over CONCACAF rival Mexico. In the quarterfinals, the U.S. lost to eventual runner-up Germany. He was named to the World Cup all-tournament team, the first American to do so.

In 2006, Reyna again captained the U.S. at the World Cup in Germany. Trailing 1–0 in the opener against the Czech Republic, Reyna fired a 30-yard shot that bounced off the post, the best American chance in the game. In the final group game against Ghana, Reyna suffered a sprained medial collateral ligament when he lost the ball to Haminu Draman who then dribbled in alone and scored Ghana's first goal.

On June 23, 2006, the day after the U.S. was eliminated from the World Cup, Reyna announced his retirement from the national team. He ended his international career with 111 caps and eight goals.

Reyna also represented the U.S. at the 1992 Summer Olympics in Barcelona and at the 1996 Summer Olympics in Atlanta, Georgia.

In Great Britain, he was occasionally referred to as Captain America because of his status as captain of the U.S. national team.

Other roles

New York City FC
On May 22, 2013, Reyna was appointed Sporting Director of MLS expansion team New York City FC. New York City FC made the conference semifinals four of the five years that Reyna was the Sporting Director. Between 2016 and 2019, New York City FC accumulated 231 points, the most of any team in the league during that time. Reyna left the club in November 2019.

Austin FC
On November 21, 2019, Reyna was named Sporting Director of another MLS expansion team, Austin FC. Reyna led the club in its 2021 inaugural season with his former US national team teammate, Austin FC head coach Josh Wolff. He guided the club through their first two seasons of existence, including an MLS Western Conference Finals appearance in 2022.

On January 26, 2023, Reyna resigned from his role as sporting director, with his oversight repurposed to being a technical advisor for the club.

Personal life
Reyna married Danielle Egan, then a member of the United States women's national soccer team, in July 1997, one week after attending the FIFA All-Star Game in Hong Kong and two weeks after the U.S. team's World Cup qualifier at El Salvador. They have had four children: Jack (1999–2012), Giovanni (born 2002), Joah-Mikel, and Carolina. Giovanni, named after former Rangers teammate Giovanni van Bronckhorst, transferred from the New York City FC development academy to Borussia Dortmund's academy in November 2018. Jack, Reyna's eldest child, died of brain cancer in 2012. The family resides in Bedford, New York.

In February 2012, Reyna and fellow New Jersey native Tony Meola were elected to the National Soccer Hall of Fame, with Reyna named on 96% of the ballots.

Reyna speaks fluent English and Spanish and is conversational in German.

During and after the 2022 World Cup, Reyna was reported to have attempted to intervene to get his son additional playing time and better treatment.  A report by US Soccer found that  that facts gathered during the investigation "might raise a question about whether Mr Reyna's communications with US Soccer officials are violative of the Fifa Code of Ethics and its rule against abuse of position". It remains to be seen whether his series of interventions will have a lasting effect on his reputation.

Career statistics

International
Scores and results list the United States' goal tally first, score column indicates score after each Reyna goal.

Honors
Rangers
 Scottish Premier League: 1999–2000
 Scottish Cup: 1999–2000

Individual
 Hermann Trophy: 1993
 Fútbol de Primera Player of the Year: 2000
 FIFA World Cup All-Star Team: 2002
 Soccer America College Team of the Century

See also
 List of men's footballers with 100 or more international caps

References

Book
More Than Goals: From Backyard Games to World Cup Competition with Mike Woitalla (2004)

External links

 

1973 births
Living people
American people of Portuguese descent
American people of Argentine descent
Jonathan Dayton High School alumni
People from Bedford, New York
People from Livingston, New Jersey
People from Springfield Township, Union County, New Jersey
Sportspeople from Essex County, New Jersey
Soccer players from New Jersey
American soccer players
Association football midfielders
St. Benedict's Preparatory School alumni
Virginia Cavaliers men's soccer players
Bayer 04 Leverkusen players
VfL Wolfsburg players
Rangers F.C. players
Sunderland A.F.C. players
Manchester City F.C. players
New York Red Bulls players
Bundesliga players
Scottish Premier League players
Premier League players
Major League Soccer players
Parade High School All-Americans (boys' soccer)
All-American men's college soccer players
Hermann Trophy men's winners
NCAA Division I Men's Soccer Tournament Most Outstanding Player winners
Designated Players (MLS)
Major League Soccer All-Stars
United States men's youth international soccer players
United States men's under-23 international soccer players
Olympic soccer players of the United States
United States men's international soccer players
Footballers at the 1992 Summer Olympics
1994 FIFA World Cup players
1995 Copa América players
1996 CONCACAF Gold Cup players
Footballers at the 1996 Summer Olympics
1998 CONCACAF Gold Cup players
1998 FIFA World Cup players
2000 CONCACAF Gold Cup players
2002 FIFA World Cup players
2003 CONCACAF Gold Cup players
2006 FIFA World Cup players
FIFA Century Club
National Soccer Hall of Fame members
American expatriate soccer players
American expatriate soccer players in Germany
American expatriate sportspeople in England
American expatriate sportspeople in Scotland
Expatriate footballers in Scotland
Expatriate footballers in England
New York City FC non-playing staff
Pan American Games gold medalists for the United States
Pan American Games medalists in football
Medalists at the 1991 Pan American Games
Footballers at the 1991 Pan American Games